is a Japanese hurdler. At the 2012 Summer Olympics, he competed in the Men's 400 metres hurdles but was disqualified.

His personal best in the 400 metres hurdles is 48.41 seconds set in Osaka in 2012.

Competition record

References

1990 births
Living people
People from Mutsu, Aomori
Sportspeople from Aomori Prefecture
Japanese male hurdlers
Olympic male hurdlers
Olympic athletes of Japan
Athletes (track and field) at the 2012 Summer Olympics
World Athletics Championships athletes for Japan
Universiade medalists in athletics (track and field)
Asian Games medalists in athletics (track and field)
Asian Games silver medalists for Japan
Athletes (track and field) at the 2014 Asian Games
Athletes (track and field) at the 2018 Asian Games
Medalists at the 2014 Asian Games
Universiade silver medalists for Japan
Medalists at the 2011 Summer Universiade
Japan Championships in Athletics winners
20th-century Japanese people
21st-century Japanese people